The Caretaker convention is a constitutional convention used in several countries that use the Westminster system.

Notable uses 
 Caretaker government of Australia
 Caretaker government of Canada